Samuel Holden (1675–1740) was an English merchant, politician, and nonconformist activist.

Life
The son of Joseph Holden by his second wife Priscilla Watt, he was employed when still young by the Russia Company at Riga. He became a successful merchant in London, a director of the Bank of England (1720–27 and 1731–40), its Deputy Governor (1727–29) and its Governor (1729–31).

A Dissenter, Holden chaired from 1732 a committee for the repeal of the Corporation Act and other Test Acts. Undertakings by Sir Robert Walpole not to obstruct actively moves for repeal turned out to be largely irrelevant when Holden tried to introduce legislation in the area. He resigned from the committee in 1736, forced out in favour of Benjamin Avery.

He married Jane Whitehalgh of the Whitehaugh, Instones, Staffordshire, with whom he had a son and 3 daughters. In 1744 his daughter and co-heir Mary married John Jolliffe, the MP for Petersfield.

Legacy

Holden left £60,000 on his death in 1740. Holden Chapel at Harvard College was constructed with some of this money.

Notes

1675 births
1740 deaths
English Dissenters
English merchants
Members of the Parliament of Great Britain for English constituencies
British MPs 1734–1741
Governors of the Bank of England
Deputy Governors of the Bank of England